Richard Decker (May 6, 1907 – November 1, 1988) a cartoonist and illustrator, studied at the Pennsylvania Museum School of Industrial Art and became famous for his cartoons published in The New Yorker.

Works
Decker worked almost 40 years as a contract cartoonist for the New Yorker. He started out in 1929 with the magazine and then eventually worked his way up to becoming well-known on the New Yorker's pages for cartoons. Decker's humor covers a broad spectrum from changing times to even his large family. Decker's work in ink and watercolor had been featured in several area exhibitions.  He did illustrations for "Look" and the "Saturday Evening Post" and did a number of advertisements for the "Philadelphia Evening Bulletin".

Recognition
Ben Yagoda has called Decker, along with Robert J. Day, "underrecognized New Yorker masters."

Death
Decker died in November 1988 at Cathcart Health Care Center in Devon, Pennsylvania. He was a resident of Berwyn, Pennsylvania.

References

Further reading
 The New Encyclopædia Britannica By Encyclopædia Britannica, inc, 2002 Page: 547
 The world through a monocle By Mary F. Corey, Pages:235, 236
  Imagining Philadelphia By Philip Stevick, Page:130
 The perennial Philadelphians By Nathaniel Burt, Pages:34, 613
 Comic art in America By Stephen D. Becker, 1959, Pages: 128,130, 384
 Mumford on Modern Art in the 1930s By Robert Mumford, Lewis Mumford, Robert Wojtowicz, Page:255
 The Eleanor Roosevelt encyclopedia By Henry R. Beasley, Holly Cowan Shulman
 Cartoon cavalcade By Thomas Craven, Florence Weiss, Sydney Weiss, 1943, Pages: 262,299,397
 
 
 
 
 The American treasury, 1455-1955 By Clifton Fadiman, Charles Lincoln Van Doren, Pages:vii, 244, 1076

External links
 The New Yorker Magazines's Timeline (refer Year 1941)
 Cartoons and Cinema of The 20th Century, A Persecptive
 Some More Work of Richard Decker for The New Yorker

American cartoonists
The New Yorker cartoonists
1907 births
1988 deaths